This is a list of films produced in South Korea in 1959.

External links

 1945-1959 at koreanfilm.org

South Korea
1959
Films